Yevgeni Anatolyevich Degtyaryov (born 7 February 1993) is a Russian football player. He plays for FC Salyut Belgorod.

Club career
He made his debut in the Russian Football National League for FC Chayka Peschanokopskoye on 1 August 2020 in a game against FC Neftekhimik Nizhnekamsk, as a starter.

References

External links
 
 Profile by Russian Football National League
 

1993 births
Sportspeople from Penza Oblast
People from Kuznetsk
Living people
Russian footballers
Association football midfielders
FC Saturn Ramenskoye players
FC Volga Nizhny Novgorod players
FC Akhmat Grozny players
FC Salyut Belgorod players
FC Chayka Peschanokopskoye players